The South Boston Naval Annex was a  United States Navy shipyard annex located in South Boston. It was the annex of the Boston Navy Yard, and was operational from the 1920 to 1974, when it was closed along with the main shipyard. The annex is also home to Dry Dock Number 3, one of the largest dry docks on the East Coast.  Most of the former annex site was listed on the National Register of Historic Places in 2022.

History

Opening
The Department of Defense purchased a large part of the Commonwealth Flats in 1920, and split up the land between the Naval Annex and the South Boston Army Base. At this time, the Navy began construction of buildings, which would continue up until World War II. Rail service to the annex was provided by Track 61.

World War II
The following spring a new power plant project was undertaken, to provide six boilers, a compressor and a primary connection to the Edison system.

This dock, which was built inside a cellular steel pile cofferdam, was completed and placed in service in March 1943. The cofferdam was later incorporated as part of Piers 5 and 6.

Work was also undertaken in 1941 on a 500-man barracks for ship's crews, necessitated by the fact that with three-shift repair work, the crews could not be quartered aboard.

The expansion of the Annex continued with the construction of an additional  pier, started in the fall of 1942, a rigger's shop, a paint shop, and a general shop, started in November of that year, and extensive improvements and additions to utilities, streets, tracks, and equipment.

The Navy’s 1940-43 expansion of the South Boston Annex was built "in an area contiguous to the Commonwealth Dock, a 1,200-foot drydock originally built by the Commonwealth of Massachusetts and subsequently acquired by the Navy (p. 168)." This pre-existing graving-dock facility is what’s now called "Dry Dock Number 3".

Post-War to closure
After the war, the annex was used to store ships that were placed in reserve. In 1974, the Boston Navy Yard was closed, and the annex became the Boston Marine Industrial Park after the City of Boston purchased the land.

Atlantic Reserve Fleet, Boston
Atlantic Reserve Fleet, Boston also called Boston Group, Atlantic Reserve Fleet opened in 1946 as part of the United States Navy reserve fleets. Some ships in the fleet were reactivated for the Korean War and Vietnam War. Some ships were upgraded or converted for new a role in the Navy. The reserve fleet closed in September 1961. The ships in the fleet were either scrapped, used as targets or move to the James River Reserve Fleet and Beaumont Reserve Fleet.

Present day 

Today, the former yard is home to the various companies which have moved in over the years, having been integrated into the larger South Boston Waterfront. Sail Boston has also used the land to host ships when they are in port as well, along with the South Boston Army Base's land, which now operates as the Black Falcon Cruise Terminal under ownership of the Massachusetts Port Authority. Built in 1943, a former Marine machine shop (known then as "Building 53") now houses Harpoon Brewery, an auto shop, and a seafood distributor. Three of the four original warehouse cranes are still in use today. The auto shop utilizes cranes 1 and 3, Nagle utilizes crane 2, and while crane 4 is present, it is disabled and stationary in Harpoon's warehouse due to space restrictions.

On 7 August 1992 the Cunard luxury liner Queen Elizabeth 2 grounded on an uncharted rock in Vineyard Sound, south of Nashawena and Cuttyhunk Islands.  The ship was repaired at Dry Dock Number 3, the only dry dock nearby capable of accommodating the QE2.  Another ship to use Dry Dock Number 3 was the former  from November 1998 to March 1999.

Many of the buildings and cranes of the Navy Annex still stand, with their numbers being maintained. Dry Dock Number 3 is used by the Boston Ship Repair company to repair ships – mostly those of the US Navy, United States Maritime Administration and Military Sealift Command.

See also
Port of Boston
South Boston Waterfront
 List of military installations in Massachusetts

References

External links
Map of the yard on Wikimapia
Video of the yard, circa 1957 or 1958

Naval Annex, South Boston
Military installations closed in 1974
Naval Annex, South Boston
Installations of the United States Navy in Massachusetts
United States Navy shipyards
Closed installations of the United States Navy
National Register of Historic Places in Boston
Historic districts on the National Register of Historic Places in Massachusetts